Ingalls is a census-designated place (CDP) in eastern Payne County, Oklahoma, about  east of Stillwater. The town was settled as a result of the "Unassigned Lands" land run in 1889, and had a post office from January 22, 1890, until October 31, 1907. It was named for Senator John J. Ingalls of Kansas. During the 1890s the population peaked at about 150, then began to decline.

Ingalls was a peaceful community that rarely ever had any commotion, until it became notable as the site of the Battle of Ingalls on September 1, 1893, which was a shootout between U.S. Marshals and the Doolin-Dalton gang. Three deputy marshals and two residents were killed, one of the residents being killed while shooting at the marshals. Several people were wounded, including two of the outlaws, and one outlaw was captured. A stone monument stands in Ingalls on the southeast corner of Ash and First (19th) Streets near the fire station, a short distance from where one of the deputies was shot.

A new post office, named Signet, Oklahoma, was established on a site slightly northwest of the old Ingalls townsite on June 21, 1921, and became part of a new community. The residents of the Ingalls part protested and the name was then officially changed back  after its closure.

Only a few deserted, old buildings are still present, including replicas of the Ingalls Hotel, its actual name the Pierce O.K. Hotel, a livery stable, saloon, and general store. There used to be a schoolhouse, the first Sunday school for a Baptist church, right in front of the old fire station building.

Today, Ingalls has re-established its quiet nature, and the population is an estimated 192 (2020). The old Ingalls lots are mainly owned by three families that have lived in or near the town for generations; the Radfords, the Burtons, and the Mathesons. The Signet portion is divided between multiple residents, and is the site of the Town Replicas. Every Saturday night, seniors with ties to the community gather at the Ingalls Community Center for a music show. A reenactment of the Battle used to occur on Sept. 1st of every year until about 2012.

Demographics

References

Sources
McRill, Leslie. "Old Ingalls: The Story of a Town That Will Not Die", Chronicles of Oklahoma 36:4 (October 1958) 429-445 (retrieved August 17, 2006)
"Oklahoma's Past: Payne County" Oklahoma Archaeological Survey.  University of Oklahoma. 23 Oct 2007.

External links
US Marshals Service-Deputies versus the Wild Bunch

Unincorporated communities in Payne County, Oklahoma
Unincorporated communities in Oklahoma
Census-designated places in Payne County, Oklahoma
Census-designated places in Oklahoma